The 1987 Burlington mayoral election was held on March 3, 1987. Incumbent Mayor Bernie Sanders won election to his fourth and final term as mayor with 55.23% of the popular vote against Democratic nominee Paul Lafayette, a member of the city council.

Sanders ran his final independent campaign for mayor stating that he would not seek reelection to another term after 1987. The Democratic Party selected Lafayette against Caryl Stewart while the Republican Party did not run a candidate.

Campaign

Independent

Incumbent Mayor Bernie Sanders, who had recently came in third in the 1986 Vermont gubernatorial election, announced on December 1, 1986, that he would seek reelection to a fourth term as Mayor of Burlington, Vermont, despite close associates stating that he was tired of being mayor. Sanders stated that he would not seek another mayoral term after the 1987 election stating that "eight years is enough and I think it is time for new leadership, which does exist within the coalition, to come up". During the campaign Sanders raised $37,480, spent $37,034, and had remaining debts of $2,020.

Democratic

Caryl Stewart, who unsuccessfully sought a seat in the Burlington city council from the 3rd ward, and Paul Lafayette, who served as a member of the city council from the 5th ward, stated on August 24, 1986, that they were considering running for the Democratic mayoral nomination. Stewart announced her mayoral campaign on September 16, and Lafayette announced his campaign on December 2. Lafayette defeated Stewart for the Democratic nomination with 636 votes to Stewart's 240.

Republican

Frederick Bailey, a member of the Burlington city council, was considered as a possible nominee for the Republicans, but later announced that he would not run. The Republicans did not select a candidate to run in the mayoral election.

Results

Results by ward

Endorsements

References

Burlington, Vermont
1987
Burlington
Bernie Sanders